Plum Grove Township is a township in Butler County, Kansas, United States.  As of the 2000 census, its population was 661.

History
Plum Grove Township was organized in 1873.

Geography
According to the USGS, it contains three cemeteries: Holderman, McGill and Potwin.

The streams of Brush Creek, Diamond Creek, East Branch Whitewater River and Henry Creek run through this township.

Further reading

References

 USGS Geographic Names Information System (GNIS)

External links
 City-Data.com

Townships in Butler County, Kansas
Townships in Kansas